The Opium War (鸦片战争) is a 1997 Chinese historical epic film directed by Xie Jin. The winner of the 1997 Golden Rooster and 1998 Hundred Flowers Awards for Best Picture, the film was screened in several international film festivals, notably Cannes and Montreal. The film tells the story of the First Opium War of 1839–1842, which was fought between the Qing Empire of China and the British Empire, from the perspectives of key figures such as the Chinese viceroy Lin Zexu and the British naval diplomat Charles Elliot.

Unlike many of its contemporaries, The Opium War was strongly supported by the state apparatus. Despite its clear political message, many Western commentators found the treatment of the historical events to be generally even-handed.

At the time of its release, The Opium War, with a budget of $15 million (USD), was the most expensive film produced in China. It was released to coincide with the Hong Kong handover ceremony in July 1997.

Plot

The story of Qing Dynasty official Lin Zexu and his battle against British imperialism is set at the start of 1838 during the first hints of the conflict that would become the Opium War which led to the ceding of Hong Kong to the British Empire. Lin Zexu is dispatched to Guangzhou to put an end to the British trader's mass selling of opium to the population, a move that leads him to blockade the East India Company. The British trade rep Eliot arrives in China to broker a public ceremony whereby the opium would be publicly dumped into the sea. This move does not please the politicos in London who promptly dispatch massive firepower to attack China's ports.

Cast

 Bao Guo'an as Lin Zexu
 Lin Liankun as Qishan
 Sihung Lung as He Jingrong
 Shao Hsin as He Shanzi
 Bob Peck as Denton (based on Lancelot Dent)
 Simon Williams as Charles Elliot
 Su Min as the Daoguang Emperor
 Jiang Hua as Guan Tianpei
 Li Shilong as Han Zhaoqing
 Li Weixin as Deng Tingzhen
 Gao Yuan as Rong'er
 Emma Griffiths as Mary Denton
 Philip Jackson as Captain White
 Garrick Hagon as Sidon Laughton
 Robert Freeman as Hill
 Denis Lill as Lord Eversley
 Corin Redgrave as Lord Melbourne
 Debra Beaumont as Queen Victoria
 Benjamin Whitrow as Lord Palmerston
 Oliver Cotton as James Bremer
 Zhou Chuanyi as Yiliang
 Ko Hsiang-ting as Yishan
 Liu Zhongyuan as Lü Zifang
 Shi Yang as Lin Sheng
 Gu Lan as senior minister
 Kong Xianzhu as He Rengui
 Chang Xueren as San
 Li Shaoxiong as Yao Huaixiang
 Yang Heping as military officer
 Yang Zhaoquan as blind musician
 Wang Fen as Qiuping
 Liang Yang as Baihe
 He Qingqing as Lanrui
 Zhang Wanwen as brothel owner
 James Innes-Smith as Prince Albert
 Edward Petherbridge as British Member of Parliament
 Dominic Jephcott as British Member of Parliament
 Tony Rushforth as British Member of Parliament
 Jamie Wilson (uncredited) as Paul Artuard
 Nigel Davenport (uncredited)

Production
The film was shot in the Hengdian World Studios in Zhejiang province, a common filming site for historical films which has been dubbed "Chinawood." In order to recreate the streets of 19th-century Guangzhou, nearly 120 construction teams from surrounding villages were assembled.
In contrast, nearly all post-production took place in Japan.

Reception
Despite its clear political background (and its release on the eve of the return of Hong Kong to China), the film was generally well received by Western critics as a workable example of the big-budget historical film. Variety, in one review, begins with the fact that despite the film's "unashamedly political message," The Opium War was nevertheless "comparatively even-handed," while the film itself had excellent production values. The Guardian recognised that the film, despite its official backing, "was relatively nuanced," and praised the performance of Bob Peck as the venal opium trader Denton.

The film's domestic release was also positive, with The Opium War eventually winning the Golden Rooster for Best Film.

References

External links
 
 
 
 The Opium War at the Chinese Movie Database

1997 films
Golden Rooster Best Film recipients
1990s Mandarin-language films
British Empire war films
Films directed by Xie Jin
Films set in 1839
Films set in 1840
Films set in 1841
Films set in 1842
Films set in 19th-century Qing dynasty
Chinese epic films
First Opium War
Chinese historical films
Films with screenplays by Zhu Sujin
Films about opium